The 1974 Suisse Open Gstaad was a men's tennis tournament played on outdoor clay courts in Gstaad, Switzerland. It was the 29th edition of the tournament and was held from 8 July through 14 July 1974. The tournament was part of the Grand Prix tennis circuit and categorized in Group B. Guillermo Vilas won the singles title and the accompanying $8,000 prize money.

Finals

Singles
 Guillermo Vilas defeated  Manuel Orantes 6–1, 6–2
 It was Vilas' first singles title of the year and the second of his career.

Doubles
 José Higueras /  Manuel Orantes defeated  Roy Emerson /  Thomaz Koch 7–5, 0–6, 6–1, 9–8

References

External links
 Official website
 ATP – tournament profile
 ITF – tournament edition details

Swiss Open (tennis)
Swiss Open Gstaad
1974 Grand Prix (tennis)